The Chrysler New Yorker is an automobile model that was produced by Chrysler from 1940 until 1996, serving for several decades as either the brand's flagship model or as a junior sedan to the Chrysler Imperial, the latter during the years in which the Imperial name was used within the Chrysler lineup rather than as a standalone brand. 

A trim level named the "New York Special" first appeared in 1938, while the "New Yorker" name debuted in 1939. The New Yorker helped define the Chrysler brand as a maker of upscale models that were priced and equipped to compete against upper-level models from Buick, Oldsmobile, and Mercury.

The New Yorker was Chrysler's most-prestigious model throughout most of its run. Over the decades, it was available in several body styles, including as a sedan, coupe, and convertible. 

Until its discontinuation in 1996, the New Yorker was the longest-running American car nameplate.

1938–1942

The New York Special Series C19 was originally introduced as a distinct sub-series of the 1938 Chrysler Imperial. It was available as a four-door sedan with a  straight-eight engine and a generous amount of comfort and space for the passengers, and a two-door Business Coupe - though no records show one was ordered and built. Unique broadcloth upholstery was specific to the New York Special, offering two single color exterior paint or four two-tone color combinations. Instrument panels were highly polished woodgrain finish and were harmonized with the upholstery colors. For 1939 it was expanded with two more coupe versions and a two-door sedan and a larger, more powerful engine from Imperial, and it took on the "New Yorker" name, dropping the "Special" tag. Prices ranged from  US$1,223 ($ in  dollars ) for the 2-passenger 2-door coupe to  US$1,298 ($ in  dollars ) for the 4-door sedan.

The first convertibles were introduced with the all-new body-design of the 1940 models. This, the C26 series, was the first New Yorker to be considered a standalone model rather than as an Imperial version. It also saw the introduction of Fluid Drive, a fluid coupling between the engine and the clutch. It was installed with a front independent coil spring and rear beam axle suspension. The only transmission available was the basic three-speed manual. There was also the "New Yorker Highlander", a special version with tartan seats and other interior elements, and the same interior approach was used on the Windsor Highlander but using a straight six engine instead. Interior color choices were listed in blue, green, brown and maroon for the cloth upholstery while the headliner, interior rear quarter panels and door panels were trimmed in a lighter, contrasting shade of upholstery color chosen

Lightly redesigned bodies were introduced for 1941, with the business coupe now being a three-window design. The bodies were all marginally wider and lower, with increased glass surface. Another new model was the Town Sedan with the rear doors having the hinges at the forward edge of the doors. This year, the Vacamatic was made available, although unlike the version sold on six-cylinder models, the Saratoga/New Yorker version was a three-speed transmission with overdrive called "Cruise and Climb".

With America entering World War II on 11 December 1941, all automobile production came to an end at the beginning of February 1942. Thus, the 1942 model year was roughly half the normal length. Cars built after December 1941 had blackout trim. The 1942s were quite modern, of a design which was heralding the post-war ponton style with fenders more incorporated into the bodywork. The grille consisted of five horizontal chrome bars that wrapped around the front, reaching all the way to the leading edge of the front wheelwell. A total of 12,145 New Yorkers of the C36 series were built this year. Chrysler would produce and experiment with engines for tanks and aircraft during World War II.

1946–1948

When production resumed after World War II in 1946, the New Yorker became the top level luxury trim package for Chrysler while the Imperial Crown offered New Yorker levels of luxury with an extended  wheelbase. Unlike most car companies, Chrysler did not make major changes with each model year from 1946 through 1948. Thus models for 1946 through 1948 Chryslers have the same basic appearance, noted for their die-cast 'harmonica' grille, based on the body introduced with the 1941 models. 1947 saw a minor redesign in tires, trim, and instrument panel, while the first 1948s were just 1947s with no visible changes. Postwar Chryslers continued to offer Fluid Drive, with the New Yorker now offering the true Presto-Matic four-speed semi-automatic transmission.

Chrysler offered the New Yorker as the luxury car to compete with the Cadillac Series 61, Buick Roadmaster and Packard Super Clipper listing the four-door sedan at US$2,073 ($ in  dollars ) before optional equipment. For customers who wanted the larger eight cylinder engine but could compromise on the luxurious appearance and interior refinement, the Chrysler Saratoga was offered. For customers who wanted the higher grade interior and appearance but wanted the fuel economy of the smaller six-cylinder engine, the Chrysler Royal short wheelbase or the longer wheelbase Chrysler Windsor were offered. For customers who liked the exterior wood body panels but wanted the luxurious appearance, the Chrysler Town and Country was offered until it was modified as a station wagon only.

The two-door sedan was offered in three variations shared with DeSoto, Dodge and Plymouth branded models. They were a three-passenger Coupe, a six-passenger Club Coupe with a sloping rear roof or the six-passenger brougham sedan with a formal rear roof appearance.

1949–1954

The 1949 New Yorker used Chrysler Corporation's new postwar body also shared by Dodge and DeSoto with ponton, three-box styling. The engine continued to be the  straight eight coupled to Fluid Drive and the Presto-Matic four-speed semi-automatic. Body styles were reduced to club coupe, four-door sedan and convertible. The previous design had been carried through early 1949, with the new (C46) series having been delayed due to a strike in late 1948. A padded dash board was optional.

A new body style was introduced for 1950, a two-door hardtop, called the Newport, and the Special Club coupe. New upgrades included foam rubber padding on the dashboard for safety. The New Yorker was the more deluxe of the regular eight-cylinder Chryslers while the Saratoga was repositioned as lower in the hierarchy offering the straight eight with plainer trim with cloth upholstery available in several colors, the  Spitfire straight-eight engine and a roomy interior featuring "chair height" seats. The "Presto-Matic" fluid drive transmission had two forward ranges, each with two speeds. In normal driving, the high range was engaged using the clutch. The car could then be driven without using the clutch (unless reverse or low range was required); at any speed above , the driver released the accelerator and the transmission shifted into the higher gear of the range with a slight "clunk". When the car came to a stop, the lower gear was again engaged.

Chrysler introduced the  FirePower Hemi V8 for 1951. The engine subsequently became a popular choice among hot rodders and racers.

The New Yorker also offered Fluid Torque Drive, a true torque converter, in place of Fluid Drive. Cars with Fluid Torque Drive came only with Fluid Matic semi-automatic transmission and had a gear selector quadrant on the steering column. Hydraguide power steering, an industry first, appeared as an option on Chrysler cars with the Hemi engine.

A station wagon was offered for 1951, with only 251 built. Its  wheelbase is the longest ever used on a station wagon.

1952 saw a small redesign on taillights with the backup lights in the lower section. This was the last year for the  wheelbase chassis for the New Yorker.

Harold A. Clark used a New Yorker as the base for a full-size sports car called the "Clark Cyclonic". The price was approximately $15,000 ($ in  dollars ) and Clark planned to produce 48 during the first year. Whether this car ever reached production is not known.

Wire wheels were now an option. The Saratoga line was dropped in 1953, replaced by the New Yorker, with the New Yorker redesignated the New Yorker DeLuxe. The convertible and Newport hardtop were available only in the New Yorker DeLuxe while the base New Yorker offered a long-wheelbase sedan and a Town & Country wagon. The convertible was New Yorker's costliest model on the  chassis for 1953 at US$3,980 ($ in  dollars ) – only 950 were built. Also new were pull-style exterior door handles.

Although introduced very late in the 1953 model year, all 1954 New Yorkers were available with the new two-speed Powerflite automatic transmission. Fluid Torque Drive and Fluid Matic were dropped. 1954 was the last year the long-wheelbase sedan was offered by Chrysler.

1955–1956

In 1955, Chrysler replaced the out of fashion high roofline designs of K.T. Keller with a new sedan that borrowed styling cues from Virgil Exner's custom 1952 Imperial Parade Phaeton and the reintroduction of the Imperial luxury brand. The tradition of adding the Newport as a suffix to the model name continued and a four-door hardtop was added, while the "St. Regis" nameplate was used for hardtops with exclusive two-tone paint. The PowerFlite transmission added a control lever on the instrument panel for 1955.

All New Yorkers for 1955 were now given the "DeLuxe" suffix, and the Club Coupe was replaced by the Imperial Newport two-door hardtop. The new, higher-priced St. Regis two-door hardtop filled the spot of the former Chrysler Windsor. The sedan, convertible, and Town & Country wagon were still offered.

Chrysler christened the 1956 model year's design "PowerStyle," a product of Chrysler designer Virgil Exner. A four-door pillarless hardtop made its debut, and the "DeLuxe" nameplate was dropped from the New Yorker for 1956.

Chrysler introduced an under-dash mounted 16 2/3 rpm record player, dubbed the "Highway Hi-Fi", that was manufactured by CBS Electronics. A two-way switch in the dash changed the input for the speaker from the all-transistor radio to the 7-inch record player. The St. Regis two-door hardtop was available with a choice of nine optional three-tone paint schemes, and the Town and Country Wagon model was Chrysler's most expensive vehicle labeled as a Chrysler for 1956, listed at US$4,523 ($ in  dollars ). Only 921 convertibles were made.

1957–1959

1957 Chrysler cars were redesigned with Virgil Exner's "Forward Look" at the cost of $300 million ($ in  dollars ) when Chrysler took on a loan in 1954 from Prudential Insurance to pay for expansion and updated car designs. The New Yorker sported fins that swept up from just behind the front doors.

Early model year production had single headlamps with quad headlamps optional where state regulations permitted them. The single headlamps were dropped later in the year. A total of 10,948 New Yorkers were built, 1,049 of them convertibles.

The 1958 New Yorker received new body-side trim and smaller taillights. "Auto-Pilot" cruise control was introduced. Sales decreased due to the recession of 1958. The convertible model was still available, with only 666 made. The reputation of Chrysler cars became tainted because of rust problems caused by rushed production and testing.

The FirePower Hemi V8 was replaced in 1959 New Yorkers by a new, less expensive to produce wedge head   Golden Lion V8. Tailfins and the front end were altered. With the departure of the Hemi the New Yorker line was repositioned as a luxury car with styling similar to the Imperial of 1958.

1960–1964

Starting with 1960, all Chrysler models adopted the grille appearance from the Chrysler 300F. The rear bucket seats that were available on the performance model 300 were also offered on the New Yorker Custom coupe.

The New Yorker entered 1961 with a new grille, slanted headlights, a continental kit on the trunk lid. The 413 CID "RB" Golden Lion V-8 continued. This was the last of the "Forward Look" models. Chrysler built 2,541 New Yorker two-door hardtops, in Canada through 1964 and 1965 in the U.S., and no longer used the nameplate "Newport" for hardtop models when the Chrysler Newport became its own model line.

The program to create all-new Chryslers for the 1962 model year was abruptly canceled in 1960. The alternative, as detailed by Chrysler designer Jeffrey I. Godshall in his article in the December 1994 issue of Collectible Automobile, was to instead take the Chrysler Corporation's full-sized 1961 models and literally "mix-and-match" them to create the 1962 Chryslers. During the 1962 model year New Yorkers would only be offered as 4-door models. Thus both the 1962 hardtop sedan and the pillared sedan were created by taking the front end of a 1961 New Yorker (updated for 1962) and mating it to the de-finned body of a corresponding 1961 Dodge Polara 4-door sedan. The Polara, which was Dodge's only long-wheelbase model, was chosen because its body's smoother sides proved to be easier to work with when creating a finless body, a major requirement for the redesign. The 1961 Polara's existing tailfins and taillights were replaced by redesigned rear-quarter panels which furnished the 1962 New Yorkers with finless rear fenders and new taillights. In a similar fashion, the 1962 New Yorker station wagon was created by mating the updated front end of an 1961 New Yorker to the body of a 1961 Plymouth Suburban 4-door station wagon. A Plymouth station wagon was Plymouth's only long-wheelbase offering, and it was chosen because it was Chrysler Corporation's only finless full-sized station wagon. Thus only four-door New Yorkers were offered, as wagons, sedans, and hardtops.
The 1962 New Yorker was the last Chrysler to have a  wheelbase.

The dash had been designed with Chrysler's push-button controls for the TorqueFlite automatic in mind, with the "AstraDome" instrument cluster covering the part of the steering column a column shifter would come out from under then-standard practice, so manual cars used a floor shifter. Due to the installation of the "AstraDome" instrument cluster extending outward towards the steering wheel, the traditional installation of the turn signal lever was relocated to the dashboard underneath the "TorqueFlite" pushbutton gear selectors and was installed as a sliding lever that would return to center as the steering wheel returned to the center position.

The 413 RB had a 4.1875 in (106 mm) bore and was used from 1959-1965 in cars. During that period, it powered all Chrysler New Yorker, 300G & 300H and Imperial Custom, Crown, and Le Baron models, and was also available on the Chrysler Newport, as well as Dodge's Polara and Monaco, and the Plymouth Fury as an alternative to the 383-cubic-inch B series engine and/or the 318 Poly.

1963-1964

Chrysler got a boost in sales in 1963 with the introduction of a five-year/50,000-mile warranty, a business practice that was unheard of by its competitors in the 1960s. The New Yorker used Chrysler's completely redesigned body with only the windshield showing traces of the previous Forward Look designs, although, under the skin, platform changes were near zero, with only a change from 12-inch "Total Contact" to Bendix-made 11-inch Duo-Servo brakes.

Changes for 1964 included a new grille, a larger rear window, and small tailfins giving the car a boxier look from the side. Canadians were given the choice of a new two-door hardtop, while Americans continued with the Salon option for the four-door pillarless hardtop. A convertible body style was no longer offered and would never be used again.

1965–1968

All 1965 Chryslers (as well as large Plymouth and Dodges) were built on an all-new C-body unibody platform that featured a bolt-on, rubber-isolated front subframe. Elwood Engel designed the 1965 New Yorker (and all Chrysler models) with styling cues from his 1961 Lincoln Continental — slab sides with chrome trim along the top edges of the fenders. The styling began to share some visual similarities with Chrysler Motors' premium luxury sedan, the Imperial, which received an all-new appearance in 1964.

The standard engine was a  Firepower  V8, with single 4-barrel carburetion. All were paired with the 3-speed TorqueFlite automatic transmission. 1965 was the last year for the 413, replaced in '66 by the new 440.

The 1965 New Yorker was offered as a 4-door sedan, 2- and 4-door hardtop, and as Town & Country 2- or 3-seat station wagon. The 4-door sedan was a six-window Town Sedan, also available in the Newport line and Dodge Custom 880 4-door Sedan. A 4-door, four-window sedan was produced but not offered in the New Yorker line. The two-door hardtop was sold in the United States. While the 300 and Newport 2-door hardtops shared a rounded, convertible-styled roof, the New Yorker had a unique roofline, resembling that of the 4-door hardtops. The more formal and squared-off lines were highlighted by a padded vinyl covering on the parallelogram-shaped rear pillar. The Town & Country wagon was on the Dodge's  wheelbase as all C-body wagons shared the same basic body. Factory options for 1965 included a vinyl rear roof pillar insert, Saginaw-sourced Tilt 'N Telescopic steering wheel, air conditioning, and power options (windows, antenna, and steering).

The 1965 Chryslers were well received by the public, and the division's sales shot up nearly 40% compared to 1963, to 204,002. 49,871 of those were New Yorkers, a 62% increase over 1964.

Styling for 1966 was an evolution of the 1965 themes. Changes included a new grille, tail lamps, and revised side trim. The biggest news was the adoption of the new Firepower 440 V8 engine. In standard form it produced ; the optional, high performance 440 TNT was equipped with a twin snorkel, silenced air cleaner and dual exhausts, and put out . The New Yorker line-up lost a model for 1966, as the Town & Country wagon was now marketed as a series on its own. The 4-door, six-window Town Sedan, and 2- and 4-door hardtop body styles were continued.

Although 1966 was another good sales year for the Chrysler division overall, with a nearly 29% increase in production and sales of 262,495, New Yorker numbers were down somewhat to 47,579.

1967 brought a complete redesign of all sheet metal below the beltline. The most recognizable new styling features were wraparound parking lights at the front and taillights at the rear. A new "fasttop" design for the two-door hardtop replaced the more formal look of 1965–66. The four-door sedan reverted to the four-window style as used on the Newport line.

Sales fell 20%, the company's lowest in five years due to an economic slump that year.

Styling changes for 1968 included a new grille, bumpers, front sheet metal, rear fenders, and rear deck. Although the Newport and 300 four-door hardtops received a new, sportier roofline shared with Dodge and Plymouth, the New Yorker continued with the roofline first introduced for 1965. Main exterior features distinguishing the New Yorker from the other Chrysler lines were a full-width grille with a rectangular pattern, repeated at the rear by the full-width deck trim, and continuous lower bodyside molding.

Chrysler production rebounded with the year setting a record at 264,863 cars built, 48,143 of which were New Yorkers, a slight improvement over the '66 level.

1969–1973

The 1969 full-size Chryslers received all new "Fuselage Styling", shared with the completely restyled Imperial. This was a major cosmetic reworking, featuring curved sides and a higher beltline, while the previous generation's underpinnings remained. The two-door hardtop received a new look harking back to the club coupes of the 1940s.

The 1970 Chryslers received minor styling changes to the grille, taillamps, and trim. The small vent windows on the front doors were dropped on the two-door hardtops.

Due to lower-than-expected sales, the facelift scheduled for 1971 was put off until 1972. Thus the 1971 models only received new grilles and taillamps. Ventless front-door windows on the four-door sedan and hardtop were new this year.

In 1972 engine power dropped to meet stricter emissions standards and rising gas prices. Chryslers received a new 'split grille' somewhat similar to the Dodge Chargers of 1971-1974. This would be the last year for the 'loop'-style front bumpers on Chryslers.

1973 was the final year for the distinctive Chrysler "Fuselage Styling", with a major reworking of the front-end treatment.

1974–1978

In 1974 rounded "Fuselage Styling" gave way to an even more massive slab-sided effect on all full-size Chryslers. This generation utilized popular styling motifs, primarily used on the Lincoln Continental. These 1974 models happened to debut at almost precisely the same time that the 1973 OPEC oil embargo began, and were a significant part of Chrysler's economic woes in the late 1970s. The 1974 models were the last full-size models Chrysler designed from the ground up.

Two New Yorker trim levels were offered in 1974, the base New Yorker and an upgraded New Yorker Brougham. The listed retail price for the four-door hardtop sedan was US$6,611 ($ in  dollars ) and 13,165 were sold, while the St. Regis appearance option package returned from the mid 1950s and was added mid-year offering fixed formal opera windows, body paint accent stripes and a forward half-covered vinyl covered roof.

For 1975, the New Yorker received a slightly revised grille, and New Yorker Brougham became the sole trim designation. The St. Regis package, introduced in mid-1974, returned for its first full year.

In 1976, the New Yorker inherited the front and rear-end styling of the discontinued Imperial, especially the covered headlights. The Imperial styling gave the New Yorker an unforeseen boost in sales, as the car looked distinctly different from the lower-priced Newport. The styling cues formerly used on the 1974 and 1975 New Yorkers, in turn, were passed on to the base Chrysler Newport.  The 1976 New Yorker also inherited the Imperial's interior styling.
  
In 1977, the standard 440-cid V8 engine was revised to include a new computer-controlled "lean burn" system, thereby allowing for more responsive acceleration and performance.
  
The 1978 New Yorker Brougham was available in 2-door and 4-door hardtop body styles. Both were the last U.S.-built true pillarless hardtop models with frameless door glass and fully opening windows. An optional "St. Regis" package included a partial "formal" padded vinyl roof that included a fixed B-pillar and opera window. This was also the final year a 2-door New Yorker was offered. Appearance changes were limited to a new segmented grill design, dual accent tape strips on the lower body sides, new rear deck stripes, and bright accents on the taillamps. The  V8 engine ( in California and high altitude regions) became the standard engine, with the  optional. The last year of the C-body New Yorker Broughams saw engineering changes that included a revised windshield wiper linkage bushing, redesigned front and rear plastic fender extensions for the bumpers, and thinner glass.

1979–1981

The 1979 R-body series was a "pillared hardtop." The  V8 was standard, the   optional through 1980. While shorter and much lighter than the previous generation, these cars still had a big car look and ride. Hidden headlamps and full-width taillights distinguished it from its R-body siblings, the Chrysler Newport, Dodge St. Regis and Plymouth Gran Fury. A new "Fifth Avenue" trim package was offered.  Sales were robust, with almost 55,000 cars sold with a listed retail price of $8,631 ($ in  dollars ).

The exterior colors offered were Dove Gray, Formal Black, Nightwatch Blue, Spinnaker White, metallic Teal Frost, Regent Red Sunfire, Sable Tan Sunfire, Medium Cashmere, Frost Blue and Teal Green Sunfire and were shared with the Newport. The interior offered a front bench seat with a 60/40 split upholstered in Richton cloth and vinyl with a folding center armrest. The front suspension continued to offer Chryslers signature longitudinal front torsion bars, called Torsion-Aire, and anti-sway bar with a solid rear limited-slip differential connected to leaf springs.

To add to its exclusivity, Chrysler offered "Convenience and Appearance Options". The list offered Open Road Handling Package, Two-Tone Paint, interior lighting, air conditioning with an upgraded climate control feature, rear window defroster, cruise control, power adjustable front seat, power windows, power electric door locks, power trunk release, luxury appearance steering wheel with an extra cost leather wrapped feature, digital clock, locking gas cap, lighting and mirrors, halogen headlamps, cornering lamps, electric adjustable outside sideview mirrors, several AM/FM radio or separate stereo radio choices to include CB and 8-track cassette player, power electric extendable antenna, various vinyl side moldings and bumper guards, undercoating, color keyed seat belts, wheel covers, and aluminum wheels, all at extra cost.

In 1980 the New Yorker gained an upscale "Special Edition" trim package, featuring a brushed stainless steel roof treatment and exclusive mahogany metallic paint, and was more modest to the top level "Fifth Avenue" appearance and equipment option package, while six two-tone color combinations were also added to the options list.  Sales were just over 13,500 cars as the price increased to $10,459 ($ in  dollars ).  During this time the Early 1980s recession in the United States began to take effect and impact sales.

In 1981 a bold new grille with simple vertical ribs appeared. The “Fifth Avenue” option package remained, and a heavily-optioned "Carriage Roof" package was added, available only in Nightwatch Blue or Mahogany Metallic, along with an extensive list of optional equipment.  With a suggested retail price increased to US$10,459 ($ in  dollars ) with an additional Fifth Avenue trim package price of US$1,300 ($ in  dollars ), sales plummeted again, to just over 6,500 cars.

1982

For 1982, the New Yorker underwent further downsizing with the model name being placed on a restyled and upgraded M-body LeBaron. In turn, the LeBaron, an M-body since 1977, was downsized onto the front-wheel drive Chrysler K-body.  The smaller New Yorker was now propelled by Chrysler's slant-six engine, with the 318 V8 the only engine option. The 1982 New Yorker was available in base and Fifth Avenue trims. Both used the formal roof treatment.

The Fifth Avenue package gave buyers a choice of pillowed "Corinthian" leather or Kimberley velvet seats while base models had cloth or optional leather seats.  The 318 V8 engine came standard with the Fifth Avenue package, along with illuminated entry system, power door locks, power driver's seat, power trunk release, AM/FM stereo, speed control, leather wrapped steering wheel, deluxe intermittent wipers, and wire wheel covers.

This car became the "Chrysler New Yorker Fifth Avenue" for 1983, and for 1984 the "New Yorker" prefix was dropped altogether; becoming the "Chrysler Fifth Avenue".

1983–1988

In 1983, the New Yorker name was used on two different models. The M-body car was now the "New Yorker Fifth Avenue" a name which changed to simply "Fifth Avenue" from 1984 to 1989. The other was an all-new K-car based New Yorker, which used the front-wheel drive Chrysler E platform, the beginning of the extended K-car years. It was the first Chrysler manufactured vehicle to offer a four-cylinder engine since the 1932 Plymouth Model PA using the Chrysler flathead four cylinder.

The E-platform New Yorker came with state-of-the-art 1980s technology, including a digital dashboard and Electronic Voice Alert, which spoke notifications such as "A door is ajar"; "Please fasten your seat belts"; "Don't forget your keys"; "Thank you" (after fastening the seat belt, closing the door tightly or removing the key from the ignition switch); "Your engine oil pressure is low - prompt service is required". Also standard was a Landau vinyl roof with electroluminescent opera lamps. This was the only Chrysler New Yorker generation with an inline-four engine. 1983 was a limited production year for the FWD New Yorker. When introduced in 1983, it shared many elements with the Chrysler E-Class and had a waterfall grille that was slightly different from the 1984-1988 versions.

For 1984, restyled wraparound taillights and a revised front grille were among the cosmetic changes. A 2.2 L I4 turbo engine was now an option and new electronic instrumentation featured a digital speedometer and odometer. Pillowed velvet seats replaced deep-nap cloth seats as standard.

In 1985, the standard engine switched from the 2.2 L I4 to a Mitsubishi-sourced 2.6 L I4.  New standard interior features included an overhead storage console with reading lamps, rear-seat headrests, and power windows.

In 1986, a Chrysler-built 2.5 L I4 replaced the 2.6 L I4 as the standard engine.  Also new was an automatic load-leveling suspension. Cosmetically, rear decklid panels, moldings, and taillights were redesigned. Interior changes included a new forward console and revised electronic instrumentation and an AM/FM stereo and deluxe intermittent wipers were now standard.

In 1987, hood vents were eliminated on the turbo models, as were fender louvers on all models. A new six-speaker Infinity sound system was optional. As with other Chryslers, the steering wheel was redesigned. This was the best-selling and last full model year for the E-platform New Yorker.

Although a new thirteenth generation New Yorker was introduced for 1988, the twelfth generation continued for one more abbreviated model year as the 1988 New Yorker Turbo. The 2.2 L I4 turbo was now the standard and only available engine. In addition to the turbo engine, previously optional yet commonly ordered equipment like automatic temperature control air conditioning, tilt steering wheel, cruise control, rear-window defogger, and power door locks became standard. While previous model year New Yorkers equipped with the optional turbo engine were commonly referred to as a "New Yorker Turbo" and wore "Turbo" badges, only the 1988 model had it as its official model name.

1988–1993

The redesigned New Yorker for 1988 was larger (see Chrysler C platform), with many underbody and suspension components carried over and sharing much of its design with the rebadged variant, the Dodge Dynasty. The new version had a V6 engine — a Mitsubishi-sourced 3.0 L unit instead of the Chrysler LA series 3.9 L V6 engine and optional anti-lock brakes. Base and Landau trim choices were offered, the latter of which carried a rear-quarter vinyl top. Hidden headlamps, a feature lost when the R-body cars were discontinued, returned. All thirteenth generation New Yorkers, as well as the reintroduced flagship 1990-1993 Imperial, were covered by Chrysler's market-leading "Crystal Key Owner Care Program" which included a 5-year/50,000-mile limited warranty and 7-year/70,000-mile powertrain warranty. A 24-hour toll-free customer service hotline was also provided.

For 1989, the 3.0 L V6 engine had a slight horsepower increase and was now mated to a new 4-speed Ultradrive automatic transmission. This year also marked the 50th anniversary of the "New Yorker" name. Although no special anniversary edition or recognition was offered at the time, it turned out to be the most popular New Yorker of the model run with over 100,000 units produced that year.

In 1990, a base model New Yorker, marketed as the "Salon" was added. The Salon was a rebadged Dodge Dynasty with exposed headlamps, horizontal taillights, and a grille similar to the Dodge. The Salon was marketed in Canada as the Chrysler Dynasty. All models carried a new Chrysler-built 3.3 L V6 engine that year. Minor changes to the interior included a revised, contoured dash. A driver's side airbag was now standard.

The Landau model was dropped for 1991 but Salon was upgraded and included more standard equipment, hidden headlights, vertical taillights, and a traditional Chrysler grille.

A styling update for 1992 produced a more rounded appearance front and rear. A padded landau roof, similar to one previously featured on the "Landau" model, was now an option on the Salon.

Last year's restyle carried into 1993. The last thirteenth generation New Yorker was manufactured on May 28, 1993.

New Yorker Fifth Avenue

In 1990, a stretched-wheelbase variant of the New Yorker was offered, marketed as the New Yorker Fifth Avenue and replacing the just-departed M-body platform. This model was discontinued in 1993.

1994–1996

The final generation of the New Yorker continued with front-wheel drive on an elongated version of the new Chrysler LH platform and was shown at the 1992 North American International Auto Show in Detroit. It was released in May 1993 along with the nearly identical Chrysler LHS as an early 1994 model, six months after the original LH cars: the Chrysler Concorde, Dodge Intrepid, and Eagle Vision, were introduced. The New Yorker came standard with the 3.5 L EGE which produced . Chrysler gave the New Yorker a more "traditional American" luxury image, and the LHS a more European performance image (as was done with the Eagle Vision). Little separated New Yorker from LHS in appearance, with New Yorker's chrome hood trim, body-color cladding, standard chrome wheel covers, and 15-inch wheels, column shifter and front bench seat, being the only noticeable differences. An option provided for 16-inch wheels and a firmer suspension type ("touring suspension"). This option eliminated the technical differences between the New Yorker and LHS. LHS came with almost all of New Yorker's optional features as standard equipment and featured the firmer tuned suspension, to go with its more European image.

During the 1994 model run, various changes were made to the New Yorker.  On the outside, New Yorker was switched to new accent-color body cladding, whereas LHS received body-color cladding. This change aligned New Yorker with the Chrysler Concorde which also had accent-color cladding. The 16-inch wheels became standard. Likewise, the touring suspension option available on early 1994 New Yorker models was discontinued, leaving only "ride-tuned" suspension. This resulted in a permanent technical difference with LHS.

For 1995, the New Yorker received Chrysler's revived blue ribbon logo (which was last used in the 1950s) on its grille, which replaced the Pentastar that had been used on models beginning in 1980.

The 1996 model featured additional sound insulation and revised structural engineering to give it a quieter ride. A new built-in transmitter replaced the remote garage door opener. The antenna was now integrated into the rear window. Due to similarities between the New Yorker and LHS, and the LHS's strong sales, the New Yorker name was dropped after a short 1996 production run. Despite being far more contemporary and monochromatic in design compared to previous models, the traditional New Yorker with its two-tone cladding and chrome trim still did not follow the modern, monochromatic styling trend of the division's other vehicles in 1996.

LH design background
The fourteenth, and final, generation New Yorker's design can be traced to 1986, when designer Kevin Verduyn completed the initial exterior design of a new aerodynamic concept sedan called Navajo. The design never passed the clay model stage.

It was also at this time that the Chrysler Corporation purchased bankrupt Italian sports car manufacturer Lamborghini. The Navajo's exterior design was reworked and became the Lamborghini Portofino, released as a concept at the 1987 Frankfurt Auto Show. The Portofino was heralded as a design triumph, setting in motion Chrysler's decision to produce a production sedan with the Portofino's revolutionary exterior design, called "cab-forward". The cab forward design was characterized by the long, low slung windshield, and relatively short overhangs. The wheels were effectively pushed to the corners of the car, creating a much larger passenger cabin than the contemporaries of the time.

Design of the chassis began in the late 1980s, after Chrysler had bought another automaker: American Motors Corporation (AMC) in 1987. During this time, Chrysler began designing the replacement for the Dodge Dynasty and Chrysler Fifth Avenue as well as a potential Plymouth. The initial design of Dodge's LH bore resemblance to the Dynasty, and this design was scrapped entirely after François Castaing, formerly AMC's Vice President of product engineering and development, became Chrysler's Vice President of vehicle engineering in 1988. The new design, under Castaing's leadership, began with the Eagle Premier, also sold later as the Dodge Monaco. The Premier's longitudinal engine mounting layout was inherited, as was the front suspension geometry, and parts of the braking system. The chassis itself became a flexible architecture capable of supporting front or rear-wheel drive (designated "LH" and "LX" respectively). The chassis design was continually refined throughout the following years, as it underpinned more Chrysler prototypes: the 1989 Chrysler Millennium and 1990 Eagle Optima.

The transmission was inspired by the Eagle Premier's ZF automatic. However, it borrowed heavily from Chrysler's A604 (41TE) "Ultradrive" transversely mounted automatic, it became the A606 (also known as 42LE). This Ultradrive transmission however was not without critics as The New York Times reported on January 25, 1991, that Consumers Union would publish in the February 1991 issue of the magazine Consumer Reports a warning for consumers to not purchase a vehicle with this "Ultradrive" transmission citing poor reliability and safety hazards. By 1990, it was decided that the new technologically advanced car would need a new technologically advanced engine to power it. Until that time, the only engine confirmed for use was Chrysler's 3.3 L pushrod V6, which would be used in the three original LH cars, the Intrepid, Vision, and Concorde, in base form. The 3.3 L engine's 60° block was bored out to 3.5 L, while the pushrod-actuated valves were replaced with SOHC cylinder heads with four valves per cylinder, creating an advanced 3.5 L V6 optional in the three smaller cars, but standard in LHS and New Yorker.

The general LH appearance, still based on the cab forward exterior design of the 1987 Lamborghini Portofino concept, with its aerodynamic shape, made for little wind noise inside this large car. This sleek styling gives the LH cars a low drag coefficient which was ahead of its time. The New Yorker featured a more monochromatic design inside and out (but less so than its LHS sibling, which had very little chrome trim), and aluminum wheels with a Spiralcast design. The single color motif was more pronounced on models without the grey lower cladding.

Upscale New Yorker models feature leather-trimmed seats, steering wheel, shift knob, and door inserts. Passenger comforts include rear center rear armrest, and 8-way power seats for both the driver and passenger, as well as personal reading lamps. Power windows and central door locks were standard, as was climate control with air conditioning, and cruise control. remote keyless entry available as an option, as was a remote activated alarm, an overhead console with a computer, power moonroof, and alloy wheels. The best stock audio options found in New Yorker are the Infinity sound systems having eight speakers positioned throughout the cabin along with an equalizer. Head units include a radio with either cassette or CD playback, and up to a five-band adjustable graphic equalizer, with joystick balance and fade control. Standard safety features included dual front airbags, anti-lock brakes (ABS), and traction control.

Dual-way power sunroofs were available on this car. They were designed and installed by American Sunroof Corp. (now ASC Global) from its Columbus, Ohio plant, not by Mopar itself. An installed sunroof eliminated most of the front overhead console that featured storage bins for a garage door opener and sunglasses. However, the Overhead Travel Information System (OTIS), or onboard computer with integrated map lights, was retained.

LHS

The five-passenger Chrysler LHS was differentiated from its New Yorker counterpart by a floor console and shifter, five-passenger seating, lack of chrome trim, an upgraded interior, and a sportier image. After a short 1996 production run the New Yorker was dropped in favor of a six-passenger option on the 1996-1997 LHS. The LHS received a minor face change in 1995 when the corporate-wide Pentastar emblem was replaced with the revived Chrysler brand emblem.

New Yorker Production

References

Works cited

External links

1974-1978 Chrysler C-bodies 
Chrysler New Yorker Online
Chrysler New Yorker page at Everything.com
1969 - 1973 Chrysler Full Size Cars
Chrysler New Yorker brief history (1983-1988)

New Yorker
Front-wheel-drive vehicles
Rear-wheel-drive vehicles
Full-size vehicles
Coupés
Sedans
1940s cars
1950s cars
1960s cars
1970s cars
1980s cars
1990s cars
Cars introduced in 1939
Luxury vehicles